This article provides details of international football games played by the Bahrain national team from 2010 to 2019.

Results

2010

2011

2012

2013

2014

2015

2016

2017

2018

2019

References

Football in Bahrain
Bahrain national football team
2010s in Bahraini sport